Venu Sriram is an Indian film director and screenwriter who works in Telugu cinema. In 2011, he made his directorial debut with Oh My Friend. He went on to direct films such as MCA (Middle Class Abbayi) (2017) and Vakeel Saab (2021).

Career

As of June 2021, Sriram is working on the pre-production of his upcoming film Icon starring Allu Arjun.

Filmography

References

External links
Venu Sriram - IMDb

Film directors from Hyderabad, India
Telugu film directors
Living people
Telugu screenwriters
Indian advertising directors
21st-century Indian film directors
Andhra University alumni
Film directors from Andhra Pradesh
21st-century Indian dramatists and playwrights
Screenwriters from Andhra Pradesh
Year of birth missing (living people)
21st-century Indian screenwriters